Jacked: The Outlaw Story of Grand Theft Auto is a 2012 book by David Kushner that describes the history of Grand Theft Auto and its founders Sam Houser and Dan Houser. It describes some of the controversies that the game went through, such as fights with Jack Thompson, its continual attempts to push up against societal limits, and the attempt to cover up the Hot Coffee mod in the release of GTA: San Andreas.

The book served as the basis for The Gamechangers, a 90-minute film about the development and cultural impact of Grand Theft Auto produced by the BBC and starring Daniel Radcliffe as Sam Houser and Bill Paxton as Jack Thompson. Rockstar sued the BBC for making the film without their consultation.

Reception
The Washington Post says that "David Kushner tries to shed some light on the studio, but his success is limited by Rockstar’s reclusiveness". It also notes the "parallels between this disruptive company and the antiheroes depicted in its games".

References

2012 non-fiction books
Grand Theft Auto
History books about video games
Wiley (publisher) books